The Rocky Mountain Philatelic Library is a privately funded public library in Denver, Colorado.

History 
The library opened on 1 August 1993. A number of moves followed but eventually on 3 August 1996 it opened at its current premises which it owns outright.

Legal status 
The library is a chartered Colorado non-profit corporation with 501(c)(3) status with the United States Internal Revenue Service. The library is a public charity and donations are treated as a charitable deduction for the purposes of United States Federal Income Tax.

Collections 
In addition to the main collection of philatelic literature, maps, auction catalogues, journals and clippings, the library is home to several specialist collections and club collections. These include the Western History and Railroad collection and the Scandinavian Collectors Club library.

Facilities 
The library has a dedicated room for society meetings and several local societies hold their regular meetings at the library. There is also a successful stamp sales division. In 2009 an additional building was purchased adjacent to the existing premises and which doubled the library's available space.

External links 
 Official website

References 

Philatelic libraries
1993 establishments in Colorado